Maritime Silk Road is a 2011 Iranian film about a man called Soleiman Siraf who, according to historical documents, was the first sailor to cross the Indian Ocean to China. His route was then called the Maritime Silk Road and many merchants took that route to get their merchandise to China. One of the passengers in this film is a young man named Shazan Ibn Yusof who keeps a log of the voyage. The Maritime Silk Road started in The Persian Gulf and continued into India, Thailand and China. Shooting for some scenes in the film took place in Kanchanaburi, Thailand and used elephants from the Taweechai Elephant Camp.

Cast
 Dariush Arjmand as Soleiman Siraf
 Reza Kianian as Edris
 Bahram Radan as Shazan
 Ezzatollah Entezami as Slaver
 Pegah Ahangarani as Mahoora
 Payam Dehkordi as Mardas

Awards
 Crystal Simorgh National Best Film - 29th Fajr International Film Festival 2011
 Crystal Simorgh Best Special Effects - 29th Fajr International Film Festival 2011
 Crystal Simorgh Best Cinematography - 29th Fajr International Film Festival 2011
 The Silver Sword Best Film - International Historical And Military Films Festival 2013

See also
Silk road

References

External links
 
 Maritime Silk Road at Film-International.com

2011 films
2011 drama films
2010s Persian-language films
Iranian drama films